Pirin Glacier is the 5.7 km long and 6 km wide glacier situated next east of Chavdar Peninsula on Davis Coast on the Antarctic Peninsula.  Situated west of Wright Ice Piedmont, north of Gregory Glacier and east of Samodiva Glacier.  Draining north-northwestwards from Boulton Peak to enter Curtiss Bay east of Seaplane Point.

The glacier is named after Pirin Mountain in southwestern Bulgaria.

Location
British mapping in 1978.

Maps
 British Antarctic Territory.  Scale 1:200000 topographic map No. 3198. DOS 610 - W 64 60.  Tolworth, UK, 1978.
 Antarctic Digital Database (ADD). Scale 1:250000 topographic map of Antarctica. Scientific Committee on Antarctic Research (SCAR). Since 1993, regularly upgraded and updated.

External links 
 Pirin Glacier Copernix satellite image

References
 Bulgarian Antarctic Gazetteer. Antarctic Place-names Commission. (details in Bulgarian, basic data in English)
 Pirin Glacier. SCAR Composite Antarctic Gazetteer

Bulgaria and the Antarctic
Glaciers of Davis Coast